Trewethen is a hamlet north of Trelill in Cornwall, England, United Kingdom.

References

Hamlets in Cornwall